Alexander 'Alex' Proud is a British entrepreneur.
He was born in Brighton, on 14 September 1969 and educated at Tonbridge School and then the University of York, where he studied Politics. In 1998 he founded Proud Gallery, the London photography gallery, which has since grown into the Proud Group with two more galleries, a nightclub and three cabaret venues. 

On GMB news UK morning show (08/11/21) during the Covid-19 pandemic Alex Proud was quoted as saying, sic "Nightclubs are safer than Supermarkets"

Early career 

On leaving the University of York in 1991 Proud began an apprenticeship with a Japanese art dealer in London before opening his first gallery in 1994 selling rare Japanese prints.

Proud Group 

In the autumn of 1998 Proud founded the photography gallery Proud Central in London’s West End.

The gallery brought high quality photography to a mainstream market, based upon a formula of exhibiting accessible shows around popular themes. Proud Galleries has three locations in Chelsea, Camden Town and the Strand.

Since its inception, the Proud Group has expanded into a number of areas including live music events, cabaret shows and restaurants.

Proud Camden is located in the 200-year-old Grade II listed Horse Hospital  in the Stables Market in Camden, London. The venue has been restored, but it retains most of its original features, including the stables that once housed the horses that were injured pulling canal barges.

Proud Cabaret  is a restaurant chain of The Proud Group.

Other work 

With photographer Rankin, Proud co-founded the photographic art book publishers Vision On, launching with Rankin’s books Nudes, Snog and CeleBritation, Audrey Hepburn by Bob Willoughby, and over 100 other titles.

Since 2013, Proud featured as a returning dealer on the Channel 4 series Four Rooms, wherein entrepreneurs and businessmen and women are pitched collectibles from members of the public. Four Rooms won Best Daytime award at 2014's Royal Television Society awards.

Proud served as a judge on Channel 4’s Picture This with photographer Martin Parr of the Magnum Photos photo agency and Brett Rogers of the Photographers' Gallery.

Proud writes a weekly column for The Daily Telegraph and has also written for the London Evening Standard and The Sunday Times.

Proud is active in politics engaging with development proposals local to the Camden community, serving as a vice chairman for Camden Town Unlimited, and also worked as an advisor to the former Liberal Democrat leader, Charles Kennedy.

Proud has been invited to judge several photography competitions including the Nikon Press Awards and The Observer Hodge Awards.

In 2008 Proud co-founded the Sony World Photography Award.

Personal life 

Proud lives between East Sussex and London.

In 2020, Proud was accused of sexually harassing members of his female staff.

References

External links 
Proud Galleries
The Strand Gallery
Proud Camden
Proud Cabaret

Living people
1969 births
British business executives
People from Brighton
People educated at Tonbridge School
Alumni of the University of York